{{Infobox fictional artifact
| name            = BFG
| image           = BFG9000.png
| alt             = 
| caption         = The BFG 9000 as depicted in Doom (top), Doom 3 (middle) and in  Doom (2016, bottom)
| first           = Doom (1993)'
| creator         = 
| type            = Weapon
|affiliation=Union Aerospace Corporation
Doomguy}}

The BFG ("Big Fucking Gun") is a fictional weapon found in many video games, mostly in id Software-developed series' such as Doom and Quake.

The abbreviation BFG stands for "Big Fucking Gun" as described in Tom Hall's original Doom design document and in the user manual of Doom II: Hell on Earth. The Quake II manual says it stands for "Big, Uh, Freakin' Gun". This euphemistic label implies the more profane name of the BFG. Another version of the name used in the Doom motion picture is "Bio Force Gun". The versions found in the Doom games are called "BFG 9000" and those in Quake "BFG 10K".

Appearances

Doom
The weapon first appeared in the press beta release of Doom. In that version, the BFG 9000 released a cloud of 80 small plasma balls (randomly green or red) per shot, which could bounce off floors and ceilings. However, it was scrapped as developer John Romero stated that it "looked like Christmas" and severely slows the game down due to the large number of on-screen sprites.Computer Gaming World described the BFG 9000 in the first commercial Doom game as "the Ultimate Weapon". It is a large energy weapon that fires giant balls of green plasma. The most powerful weapon in the game, it causes major damage to most types of enemies and can clear an entire room of foes in one shot, or deal huge damage to singular enemies. In the first Doom, the weapon can only be picked up in the third and fourth episodes. The BFG 9000 also appears virtually unchanged in Doom II: Hell on Earth, Final Doom, Doom 64, and Doom RPG.

Other versions
In Doom 3, the BFG 9000 is a charged weapon: holding down the trigger causes the weapon to accumulate energy before release, resulting in a more powerful shot. Overcharging the BFG too much will cause it to overheat and explode, killing the player instantly.Quake II and Quake III Arena pay homage to the BFG 9000 with a pair of weapons both called the BFG10K. The Quake II version fires a slow plasma glob that fires rays at any enemies in range and line-of-sight. The Quake III Arena version of the BFG fire a series of fast plasma orbs, and acts quite like the Rocket Launcher (rocket jumping can also be done with the BFG10K). The BFG10K from Quake III also appears in OpenArena (different look, but same behaviour) and Quake Live (with slightly modified characteristics). Rage also pays homage to the BFG 9000 with a weapon known as the "Authority Pulse Cannon", which fires "BFG Rounds".

In the Doom movie, the "bio force gun" fires a bright blue projectile that appears to burst on impact and spray a caustic substance over its target and the surrounding area.

The BFG makes a return in the 2016 reboot, but unlike in its first two appearances, it follows the mechanics of its Quake II rendition, firing a projectile that shoots beams at enemies. The game itself doesn't resolve the acronym "BFG" either in-game or in its codex entries, although one challenge in the game's final campaign level involving the BFG is called "Big [REDACTED] Gun" as a nod to the original vulgar name.  In that game's pinball adaptation, it is called the "Big Fancy Gun", and is the most powerful weapon that the Doom Slayer can obtain; collecting it will grant the player an extra ball. It also makes a return in 2020's Doom Eternal, where it's functionally identical to the 2016 version; it is introduced as the main component of the BFG 10000, which appears as a massive interplanetary cannon mounted on Mars' moon, Phobos, used by the Doom Slayer to shoot a hole into the surface of Mars.

 Mechanics 

 Doom, Doom II: Hell on Earth and Final Doom 
The BFG's internal game mechanics are two-fold. When the trigger is pulled, there is a pause of 30 game tics (≈0.857 seconds) before a large, relatively slow moving green and white plasma projectile is ejected. The actual projectile deals a significant amount of damage (between 100 and 800 hit points of damage, in multiples of 100), but the majority of the damage is dealt 16 game tics (≈0.457 seconds) after the direct hit in a 45-degree (90 degree wide) cone originating from the player who fired the shot, via 40 invisible tracers, causing each tracer to deal random damage of between 15 and 120 hit points of damage on a solid object within 1,024 map units. 

Standing closer to the target causes them to absorb more tracers. The direction of the cone corresponds to the original shot, but it radiates from the player's current location at the time of the main projectile's impact. The player can move, even into a different room, and deal damage there, given enough time before the projectile's impact.

Appearances and homages outside Doom and Quake
The BFG also makes an appearance in Avalanche Studios' Rage 2.

A similar weapon makes an appearance in MachineGames' Wolfenstein 2: The New Colossus. According to the game's plot, the weapon, named "Übergewehr" ("Super-rifle" in German), was developed by the Nazis in the 1960s. It utilizes a mixture of laser and diesel energy, as well as a mysterious third source of energy, described as “extra-dimensional microportals", possibly hinting that it is the same Argent Energy mentioned in Doom (2016) onwards. The behaviour of the weapon is similar to Doom 3's BFG: it can be charged in order to release a sphere of energy strong enough to vaporize a horde of soldiers.

A contemporary game, Jazz Jackrabbit, named the gun of the protagonist as LFG-2000 (Laser Flash Gun 2000)

The fusion research company First Light commissioned Physics Applications Inc. to build a high velocity projectile fusion research tool, which is named “The Big Friendly Gun”, and refer to this as the “BFG”. 

BFR

"BFR" was the codename for SpaceX's privately funded launch vehicle announced by Elon Musk in September 2017. SpaceX President Gwynne Shotwell has stated that BFR stands for "Big Falcon Rocket". However, Elon Musk has explained that although BFR was the code name, he drew inspiration from the BFG weapon in the Doom video games. The BFR had been referred to informally by the media and internally at SpaceX as "Big Fucking Rocket". The upper stage was called Big Falcon Ship (unofficially "Big Fucking Ship"). The BFR was eventually officially renamed to "Starship".

Reception
UGO.com ranked the BFG 9000 at number two on their list of top video game weapons of all time, stating "it was marvellous and complex, and we should not hesitate to put this weapon down in history as one of the best." X-Play'' ranked it number one on their list of top "badass" weapons, stating that while "not as fancy as the Gravity Gun", it was the first weapon that "really made us swoon". IGN also listed the BFG as one of the hundred best weapons in video games, placing it at number 2, saying that "The BFG established exactly what we should expect when it comes to powerful in-game weaponry". Machinima.com named it number one on their list of top video game weapons, stating "Do you really need a reason why this tops the list?"

References

Video game objects
Fictional energy weapons
Doom (franchise)
Quake (series)

Fictional elements introduced in 1993